Idiot is a 2012 Bengali romantic action-comedy film directed by Rajiv Kumar Biswas, starring Ankush Hazra and Srabanti Chatterjee in lead roles. It is a remake of the 2006 Tamil language comedy film Thiruvilaiyaadal Aarambam. This film marked Aditya Pancholi's debut in Bengali cinema.

Plot
Samrat falls in love with Anjali. Their love life gets on track. It was smooth sailing until the  Anjali's ruthless brother gets into the picture. He does not accept Samrat. So Samrat tricks him and becomes a bigger business magnate and as a result, is accepted by everyone.

Cast
 Ankush Hazra as Samrat
 Srabanti Chatterjee as Anjali, Samrat's girlfriend
 Aditya Pancholi as Anjali's elder brother Ranavijay Sinha
 Debjani Chattopadhyay as Anjali's sister-in-law
 Rajkumar Patra as Sujay Ghatak
 Pradip Dhar

Soundtrack
 "Sajna Paas Aa Tu Jara" - Shaan and Mahalakshmi Iyer
 "Pagli Toke Rakhbo Boro Adore" - Zubeen Garg and Akriti Kakkar
 "Hori Din To Gelo" - Zubeen Garg
 "Havvy Lagche" - Zubeen Garg
 "Jhor Othe Mone" - Zubeen Garg and Mahalakshmi Iyer
 "Toke Hebbi Lagche" - Zubeen Garg

References

2012 films
Bengali remakes of Tamil films
Bengali-language Indian films
2010s Bengali-language films
Films scored by Shree Pritam
Bengali action comedy films
Films directed by Rajiv Kumar Biswas